Joshua Owiti (born 1959) has been the Anglican Bishop of Maseno East since 2016.

References

21st-century Anglican bishops of the Anglican Church of Kenya
Anglican bishops of Maseno East
Living people
1959 births